The Winnipeg Sea Bears are a Canadian professional basketball team based in Winnipeg, Manitoba, that competes in the Canadian Elite Basketball League (CEBL). They play their home games at the Canada Life Centre in Winnipeg.

History
On November 9, 2022, the Canadian Elite Basketball League announced that it’s 10th franchise would be in Winnipeg, Manitoba. 
 
On November 30, 2022, the Winnipeg franchise officially unveiled their branding, announcing their name and logo as the Winnipeg Sea Bears. They will be playing at the Canada Life Centre.

On December 14th, 2022, the Sea Bears announced that Mike Taylor was hired as the team’s inaugural head coach.

Players

Current roster

External links 
 Official website

References 

 
 

Basketball teams established in 2022
2022 establishments in Manitoba
Basketball in Manitoba
Sports teams in Winnipeg
Canadian Elite Basketball League teams